HPAE may stand for:

 High Performing Asian Economies
 High Performance Anion Exchange Chromatography
 Health Professionals and Allied Employees, a health care labor union.